Carrick Island is a small island in the Quabbin Reservoir in Massachusetts, roughly  by . It is part of the Town of Petersham, in Worcester County. The island lies just west of the much larger Mount Zion Island, the largest island in the reservoir.

Lake islands of Massachusetts
Islands of Worcester County, Massachusetts
Petersham, Massachusetts
Islands of Massachusetts